Marek Ženíšek (born 26 November 1978) is a Czech politician and political scientist. From 2009 to 2019, he was the vice-chairman of TOP 09 (from 2015 to 2017 First Vice-chairman of the party). From 2013 to 2017, he was a Member of the Chamber of Deputies, and has also served as Deputy Minister of Justice, and First Deputy Minister of Health. Since 2020, Ženíšek is a regional assembly member in the Plzen Region and a Deputy Governor.

Early life and education

Marek Ženíšek was born in Plzeň on 26 November 1978. He graduated from the Faculty of Humanities of the University of West Bohemia in Plzen (now the Faculty of Arts) and the Faculty of Social Sciences of Charles University in Prague. In 2006, he received a doctorate in political science from the University of West Bohemia.

Academic career
He is the author or co-author of several books and academic articles on political and electoral systems, and is the scientific secretary of the Czech Society for Political Science. Since 2003, he has been lecturing at the Department of Political Science and International Relations of the Faculty of Philosophy of the University of West Bohemia, and since 2008 also at the Prague Metropolitan University.

Political career

From 2005 to 2009, Ženíšek was a member of the Christian and Democratic Union - Czechoslovak People's Party (KDU-ČSL). After the municipal elections in 2006, he became a representative in one of the city districts of Plzen, holding the mandate until 2010. In 2007, he began working at the Ministry of Justice, from 2008 as Deputy Minister. He was also a member of the Government Council for National Minorities.

In June 2009, he became a member of the preparatory committee of TOP 09. At the National Constituent Assembly of the party on 27 and 28 November 2009, he was elected vice-chairman. At the second National Assembly of TOP 09, which took place on 22–23 October 2011 in Hradec Králové, he was re-elected as vice-chairman of TOP 09. As vice-chairman he was responsible for foreign relations. At the third National Assembly in Prague on 8 December 2013, he was again re-elected vice-chairman. 

At the beginning of 2012, he was appointed First Deputy Minister of Health by Leoš Heger, dealing mainly with the economic management of the Ministry itself and its directly managed organizations. He was involved in the beginning of the long-term project to reform psychiatry in the Czech Republic. In the regional elections in the autumn of 2012, he was elected to the Plzen Regional Assembly, but resigned this mandate due to the conflict with his role as Deputy Health Minister. He resigned as First Deputy Minister of Health following the inauguration of Jiří Rusnok's government on 1 August 2013, saying he could not imagine continuing at the ministry while also vice-chairman of TOP 09.

In the parliamentary elections in 2013, Ženíšek was elected to the Chamber of Deputies as the lead candidate for TOP 09 in the Plzen Region. In November 2015, at the fourth TOP 09 National Assembly in Prague, he was elected the party's 1st vice-chairman, receiving 124 votes out of 173 delegates (72%), and replacing Miroslav Kalousek, who became the party's chairman. He was again top of the TOP 09 list at the 2017 election, but was not re-elected. At the end of November 2017, he was elected TOP 09 vice-chairman, and was replaced by Markéta Pekarová Adamová as the party's first vice-chairman.

In the elections to the European Parliament in May 2019, he ran as a member of TOP 09 in 6th place on the candidate list "Mayors (STAN) with regional partners and TOP 09", but was not elected. In November 2019, he stood unsuccessfully for re-election as vice-chairman of TOP 09.

In the regional elections in 2020, he was elected to the Plzen Regional Assembly as a member of TOP 09, on the list for the "Civic Democratic Party with the support of TOP 09 and independent mayors" group. On 12 November 2020, he became a regional councillor of the Plzen Region with responsibility for culture and monument care.

For the 2021 parliamentary election, he was elected on the list of the SPOLU coalition of ODS, KDU-ČSL and TOP 09 in the Plzeň Region.

Personal life

Ženíšek is married and has a son. His leisure interests include reading, sports and traveling.

References

1978 births
Living people
TOP 09 MPs
University of West Bohemia alumni
Academic staff of the University of West Bohemia
Czech political scientists
Politicians from Plzeň
Members of the Chamber of Deputies of the Czech Republic (2013–2017)
Members of the Chamber of Deputies of the Czech Republic (2021–2025)